Scoparia astragalota is a species of moth in the family Crambidae. This species is endemic to New Zealand.

Taxonomy
This species was named by Edward Meyrick in 1884 as Xeroscopa astragalota. Meyrick gave a description of the species in 1885. Meyrick placed this species within the genus Scopaira in 1913. However the placement of this species within Scoparia is in doubt. As a result, this species has also been referred to as Scoparia (s.l.) astragalota.

Description
The wingspan is about 27 mm. The forewings are light ochreous, suffused with white and with black markings, as well as suffused with reddish fuscous. The hindwings are pale whitish-grey, tinged with ochreous. The lunule, postmedian line and apex are greyer. Adults have been recorded on wing in December and January.

References

Moths described in 1884
Moths of New Zealand
Scorparia
Endemic fauna of New Zealand
Taxa named by Edward Meyrick
Endemic moths of New Zealand